The Big Booth was a short-lived BBC radio programme that aired from January 2000 to March 2001.  There were 12 half-hour episodes and it was broadcast on BBC Radio 4.  It starred Boothby Graffoe.

Notes and references
 
 BBC Radio 4 Extra programme page

2000 radio programme debuts
BBC Radio 4 programmes